Bharatiya Forward Bloc was a political party in Tamil Nadu, India. The president of the party was K.A. Murugan (alias 'Muruganji'). In difference to other Forward Bloc splinter factions, the BFB aligned with the Vishva Hindu Parishad (VHP).

The party merged with the All India Forward Bloc ahead of the 2006 legislative election.

References

Defunct political parties in Tamil Nadu
Political parties with year of establishment missing
All India Forward Bloc